Cesare Mansueto Giulio Lattes (11 July 1924 – 8 March 2005), also known as César Lattes, was a Brazilian experimental physicist, one of the discoverers of the pion, a composite subatomic particle made of a quark and an antiquark.

Life
Lattes was born to a family of Italian immigrants in  Curitiba, Paraná Brazil. He did his first studies there and also in São Paulo. He then went to the University of São Paulo, graduating in 1943, in mathematics and physics. He was part of an initial group of young Brazilian physicists who worked under European teachers such as Gleb Wataghin and Giuseppe Occhialini. Lattes was considered the most brilliant of those and was noted at a very young age as a bold researcher. His colleagues, who also became important Brazilian scientists, were Oscar Sala, Mário Schenberg, Roberto Salmeron, Marcelo Damy de Souza Santos and Jayme Tiomno. At the age of 25, he was one of the founders of the Brazilian Center for Physical Research (Centro Brasileiro de Pesquisas Físicas) in Rio de Janeiro.

From 1946 to 1948, Lattes launched on his main research line by studying cosmic rays. He travelled to England arriving in February 1946, to join his teacher Occhialini who had arrived the previous year, to work in the group directed by Cecil Powell at the H. H. Wills Physics Laboratory of the University of Bristol.  There, he improved on the nuclear emulsion used by Powell by adding more boron to it. In 1947, he collaborated  with Powell, Occhialini and Hugh Muirhead in the experimental discovery of the pion (or pi meson).  In the same year, he together with Powell and Occhialini determined the new particle's mass. In April 1947 he visited a weather station on top of the 5,200-meter high Chacaltaya mountain in Bolivia, using photographic plates to register the rays, and reveal more 'pion decay events'.  A year later, working with Eugene H. Gardner (1913-1950) at UC Berkeley, Lattes was able to detect the artificial production of pions in the lab's cyclotron, by bombarding carbon atoms with alpha particles. He was just 24 years old.

In 1949, Lattes returned as a professor and researcher with the Federal University of Rio de Janeiro and the Brazilian Center for Physical Research. After another brief stay in the United States (from 1955 to 1957), he returned to Brazil and accepted a position at his alma mater, the Department of Physics of the University of São Paulo.

In 1967, Lattes accepted a position of full professor with the new "Gleb Wataghin" Institute of Physics at the State University of Campinas (Unicamp), which he helped to found. He became also the chairman of the Department of Cosmic Rays, Chronology, High Energies and Leptons. In 1969, he and his group discovered the mass of the so-called fireballs, a phenomenon induced by naturally occurring high-energy collisions, and which was detected by means of special lead-chamber nuclear emulsion plates invented by him, and placed at the Chacaltaya peak of the Bolivian Andes.

Lattes retired in 1986, when he received from the Unicamp the titles of doctor honoris causa and professor emeritus. After retirement he continued to live in a house in the suburban area very near to the University's campus. He died of a heart attack on March 8, 2005 in Campinas, São Paulo.

Legacy
Lattes is one of the most distinguished and honored Brazilian physicists, and his work was fundamental for the development of atomic physics. He was also a great scientific leader of Brazilian Physics and was one of the main personalities behind the creation of the important Brazilian National Research Council (Conselho Nacional de Desenvolvimento Científico e Tecnológico). Due to his contribution in this process, the Brazilian national science data-base, Lattes Platform was named after him.

He figures as one of the few Brazilian scientists in the Encyclopædia Britannica. Although he was the main researcher and the first author of the historical Nature article describing the pion, Cecil Powell alone was awarded the Nobel Prize for Physics in 1950 for "his development of the photographic method of studying nuclear processes and his discoveries regarding mesons made with this method". The reason for this apparent neglect is that the Nobel Committee policy until 1960 was to give the award to the research group head, only. He received the TWAS Prize in 1987. After his death UNICAMP decided to give his name to the central library.

Quote
"Science should be universal, without a doubt. However, one should not believe unconditionally in this."

Culture

Gilberto Gil's Grammy-winning 1998 album Quanta includes a song dedicated to Lattes, called "Ciência e Arte".

References

Bibliography

Further reading

External links
 C.M.G. Lattes. Encyclopædia Britannica.
 Special Dedication to Cesar Lattes. UNICAMP Archive System, March 2005.
 To Cesar What Belongs to Lattes. State University of Campinas (in Portuguese).
 Cesar Lattes, a Brief Biography. Brazilian Center of Physical Research (in Portuguese).
 Photos of César Lattes at Chacaltaya, Bolivia.
 Lattes Platform (in Portuguese).

Brazilian physicists
Brazilian nuclear physicists
Brazilian scientists
Brazilian Jews
Brazilian people of Italian-Jewish descent
1924 births
2005 deaths
Recipients of the National Order of Scientific Merit (Brazil)
University of São Paulo alumni
Academic staff of the Federal University of Rio de Janeiro
Academic staff of the State University of Campinas
People from Curitiba
People from Campinas
TWAS laureates
20th-century Brazilian scientists
21st-century Brazilian scientists